Petra Kamínková (née Drajzajtlová; born 19 January 1973) is a Czech long distance runner. She won nine consecutive races in the annual 10 km Běchovice – Prague Race. She is a 17-time national champion.

Kamínková won the women's 2005 Zwolle Half Marathon. She was the first Czech woman to finish the 2015 Olomouc Half Marathon.

References

External links 

1973 births
Living people
Sportspeople from Olomouc
Czech female long-distance runners
Czech female marathon runners